Harry Clark may refer to:
Harry C. Clark (1883–1950), mayor of San Diego, California
Harry Clark (actor) (1913–1956), American actor
Harry Clark (cricketer) (1892–1973), Australian cricketer
Harry Clark (footballer, born 1932), English football forward for Darlington, Sheffield Wednesday and Hartlepool
Harry Clark (footballer, born 1934), English footballer inside forward for Sunderland
Harry Clark (playwright), American cellist and playwright
Harry E. Clark, American football player and coach
Harry Hayden Clark (1901–1971), American professor of English
Harry R. Clark, member of the Arizona House of Representatives

See also
Harry Clarke (disambiguation)
Henry Clark (disambiguation)
Harold Clark (disambiguation)
Harrison Clark (disambiguation)